AutoZone, Inc. is an American retailer of aftermarket automotive parts and accessories, the largest in the United States. Founded in 1979, AutoZone has 6,978 stores across the United States, Mexico, Puerto Rico, Brazil and the US Virgin Islands. The company is based in Memphis, Tennessee.

History

1970s
Originally a division of Memphis-based wholesale grocer Malone & Hyde, the company was known as Auto Shack. After the sale of the grocery operation to the Fleming Companies of Oklahoma City, Oklahoma, the name of the company was changed to AutoZone to reflect the new focus and to settle a lawsuit brought by Tandy Corporation for infringing on Tandy's "Radio Shack" trademark.

On July 4, 1979, the first store opened in Forrest City, Arkansas under the name of Auto Shack. Doc Crain was the store's first manager. Sales that first day totaled $300.00.

1980s
In 1981, Express Parts or VDP is implemented to get the customers hard to find parts by special ordering them through wholesalers. Total stores was 73 in 7 states.

In 1984, the company became the first auto parts retailer to create a quality control program for its parts. Total stores was 194 in 13 states.

In 1985, Doc Crain coined the term WITTDTJR, which stands for "What it takes to do the job right." Total store count is 263 in 14 states. Peter Formanek stepped in as president. He oversaw the auto parts firm's daily operations and worked on growth strategy.

By 1986, expansion had made the company grow into a large store chain across the South and the Midwest. That year, Darren Reltherford, manager of Auto Shack's Memphis, Tennessee store, received the first Extra Miler award, which has since been given to AutoZoners who show their dedication to customer satisfaction by "going the extra mile" for customer service. The Duralast line of alternators and starters was released. The Loan-A-Tool program begian allowing customers the ability to borrow specific tools for jobs. The fourth distribution center in Greenville, South Carolina opened. The total number of stores was 339 in 15 states.

In 1987, Auto Shack officially changed its name to AutoZone. The first AutoZone store was in Enid, Oklahoma. That year also, the company introduced WITT-JR, an electronic catalog used to look up parts and keep warranty information. The total number of stores was 459 in 16 states.

In 1989, the company began using a computerized store management system (SMS). The Duralast battery line was released consisting of Sub-Zero, Desert and long life. The total number of stores was 513 in 17 states.

1990s
In 1991, its stock began trading on the New York Stock Exchange using the ticker symbol "AZO." It opened up at $27.50 a share. The fifth DC opens in Lafayette, Louisiana.  The company also became the first auto parts retailer to register customer warranties in a computer database.

In 1994, AutoZone began using satellites to facilitate communication between stores and the corporate office. Sales hit $1.5 billion.

In 1995, AutoZone opened its 1,000th store in Louisville, Kentucky. Also, the Duralast trademark made its debut with the Duralast and Duralast Gold batteries. Total of stores is now 1,143 in 26 states.

1996 was the year when the Internet era arrived at the company, when AutoZone opened its company Web site. The new commercial program debuted in Germantown, Tennessee. ALLDATA, a software company based in Elk Grove, California that provides automotive diagnostic and repair information, was acquired.

Company founder Pitt Hyde retired as chairman and CEO in 1997.  John Adams became the new chairman and CEO.

In 1998, AutoZone acquired ADAP Inc. Who had stores under the ADAP Discount Auto Parts and Auto Palace nameplates respectively, both being auto parts chains in the northeastern United States with 112 stores, TruckPro L.P., a chain with 43 stores in 14 states, and the 560-store Chief Auto Parts Inc., a chain with a presence in 5 states. At the commencement of fiscal 1999, AutoZone made another acquisition by purchasing 100 Express stores from The Pep Boys—Manny, Moe & Jack. The company began a process of internationalization with their first store abroad, which opened in Nuevo Laredo, Mexico. AutoZone closed the 1990s by debuting at the Fortune 500 list in 1999.

2000s
Steve Odland became AutoZone's third CEO in 2001. Also in 2001, AutoZone sold TruckPro to Paratus Capital Management.

In 2002, AutoZone developed a network of "hub, feeder, and satellite" stores to have more product in the market area, while reducing inventory investment. Sales hit $5.33 billion.

In 2003, the Duralast tool line was introduced. This was a year of important negotiations for AutoZone, as the company partnered with other important auto parts industry companies, such as CarMax and Midas. AutoZone de Mexico opens the first DC in Nuevo Laredo, Mexico. Total stores  number 3,219 in 48 states and 49 in Mexico. In 2004, founder J.R. "Pitt" Hyde III was inducted into the Automotive Hall of Fame.

In 2005, William C. Rhodes III was named president and CEO. Steve Odland left to become the chairman and CEO of Office Depot.

In 2007, Bill Rhodes, then 42, was named chairman, president and chief executive officer of AutoZone, Inc. on June 6.

In 2008, AutoZone opened their 4,000th store in Houston, Texas. Sales hit $6.2 billion.

2010s

On December 15, 2011, ALLDATA LLC, an operating unit of AutoZone, expanded its direct presence in Canada to better serve its growing customer base.

On August 17, 2012, AutoZone expanded into their 49th state Alaska by opening their 5,000th store in Wasilla, Alaska

In 2012 AutoZone opened their first store in Brazil.

In December 2012, AutoZone purchased AutoAnything.com, an ecommerce leader in aftermarket automotive parts based in San Diego, California.

By April 2017, AutoZone had been the largest retailer of automotive parts in North America for three consecutive years. As of August 2017, AutoZone had 5,465 locations in the United States, 524 locations in Mexico, and 46 locations in Brazil, for a total of 6,035.

On October 22, 2018, Pitt Hyde announced that he would be stepping down from AutoZone's board of directors.

2020s 

In late May 2020, two AutoZone stores were destroyed by arson during the George Floyd protests in Minneapolis–Saint Paul.

Corporate affairs
AutoZone is incorporated in the state of Nevada.

Headquarters
As of 2013 there were over 1,200 employees there.

The project manager of the building's construction was Rob Norcross, a principal at LRK Inc. The building has the capability to withstand a 9.0 magnitude earthquake because it has a special base isolation system that had a price tag of $950,000.

Private labels

Valucraft, Duralast, and Duralast Gold are AutoZone's private label brands for lead-acid automotive batteries (manufactured primarily by Johnson Controls, but also East Penn, Exide, and other manufacturers). Duralast Platinum is an AGM line of batteries. AutoZone also sells tools under the Duralast brand which carry a lifetime warranty.

Brake pad labels include (ranging from least to most expensive):
Duralast - OEM-like performance; semi-metallic or organic.
Duralast Gold - OEM design and performance; semi-metallic or ceramic.
Duralast Max (in the process of being phased out) - superior to OEM design and performance; ceramic.
Duralast Elite (currently being introduced selectively by market) - superior to OEM design and performance; ceramic; copper-free.
Duralast GT Street - performance pads for select applications.

Valucraft pads are being phased out, as of early 2015. Duralast GT Street pads introduced early 2018.

The Valucraft, Duralast, and Duralast Gold names are used on various other parts and accessories as well.

Duralast Elite pads were first trademarked  and began being introduced to select markets in early 2020.

Retail stores
AutoZone's 6,978 retail outlets as of November 19, 2022 throughout the United States, Mexico and Brazil stock a variety of aftermarket parts as well as some OEM parts. All AutoZone stores are corporately owned; the company does not have franchise operations.

Sponsorships
In 2004, AutoZone celebrated its 25th anniversary and announced a corporate sponsorship agreement with auto racing association NASCAR.

In 2007, AutoZone sponsored Kevin Harvick and Timothy Peters in the NASCAR Busch Series.

AutoZone holds the naming rights to the downtown Memphis baseball stadium that is the home of the Memphis Redbirds of the Pacific Coast League. The company also sponsors the AutoZone Liberty Bowl. The AutoZone Liberty Bowl, alongside the College Football Playoff Foundation donated $250,136.03 to the St. Jude Children's Research Hospital. The AutoZone Liberty Bowl awarded 2018's Distinguished Citizen Award to Priscilla Presley.

They are an official sponsor of Bellator MMA, the world's second largest Mixed Martial Arts promotion.

Lawsuits 

AutoZone paid $3.3 million to settle a lawsuit by the families of a family who was killed due to being rear-ended by an AutoZone-owned truck. The suit alleges that AutoZone was negligent in training the driver of the truck.

AutoZone faced a lawsuit for gender discrimination in which the plaintiff alleged that men treated her differently when she was promoted and that she feared revealing a pregnancy to her superior. When the pregnancy was discovered, she alleges that her district manager pressured her to step down from her position. She was demoted in February 2006 and fired in November 2011. The jury on the case ruled in 2014 in favor of the plaintiff, awarding her $185 million in punitive damages as well as approximately $873,000 in back wages. AutoZone has announced its intention to appeal the verdict. The Wall Street Journal'''s Jacob Gershman suggested that the verdict would be scaled back, noting that the jury verdict is not the end-all be-all.

A Georgia woman was fired after a customer insulted her and used multiple racial epithets against her. She alleges that the district manager told her to "suck it up," and she is filing a lawsuit against AutoZone for violating her civil rights.

AutoZone came under fire from allegations that a district manager had told an employee to remove a flag displayed on the company's premises for the sake of improved diversity. AutoZone denies that and claimed that it was the poor means by which the flag was put up, with duct tape and suction cups.

In June 2019 AutoZone entered into an $11 million settlement against with the State of California to resolve allegations that the company had violated state laws governing hazardous waste, hazardous materials, and confidential consumer information. AutoZone is charged with illegally disposing of millions of hazardous waste items, including used motor oil and automotive fluids, at landfills not authorized to accept hazardous waste.

See also

 Advance Auto Parts
 CarParts.com
 Carquest
 National Automotive Parts Association (NAPA)
 O'Reilly Auto Parts
 Pep Boys
 SCO v. AutoZone''

References

External links

 AutoZone web site
 AutoZone corporate site

Automotive part retailers of the United States
Companies based in Memphis, Tennessee
American companies established in 1979
Retail companies established in 1979
1979 establishments in Arkansas
Companies listed on the New York Stock Exchange
1991 initial public offerings

sah:AutoZone